Yukimasa is a masculine Japanese given name.

Possible writings

Yukimasa can be written using different combinations of kanji characters. Here are some examples: 

幸正, "happiness, righteous"
幸昌, "happiness, bright"
幸政, "happiness, political"
幸真, "happiness, true"
行正, "to go, righteous"
行昌, "to go, bright"
行政, "to go, political"
之正, "of, righteous"
之政, "of, political"
志正, "determination, righteous"
志昌, "determination, bright"
志真, "determination, true"
恭正, "respectful, righteous"
雪昌, "snow, bright"
雪真, "snow, true"

The name can also be written in hiragana ゆきまさ or katakana ユキマサ.

Notable people with the name
, Japanese voice actor
, Japanese judoka
Yukimasa Sanada (真田 幸政, ????–1653), Japanese hatamoto

Fictional characters
 Yukimasa Aida, a character in the visual novel The House in Fata Morgana

Japanese masculine given names